Cremnothamnus is a genus of flowering plants belonging to the family Asteraceae. It contains a single species, Cremnothamnus thomsonii.

Its native range is Central Australia.

References

Gnaphalieae
Monotypic Asteraceae genera
Taxa named by Christopher Francis Puttock